Ugarchin Municipality is a municipality (obshtina) in Lovech Province, Central-North Bulgaria, located from the area of the so-called Fore-Balkan to the Danubian Plain. It is named after its administrative centre - the town of Ugarchin.

Settlements

 Dragana (Драгана)
 Golets (Голец)
 Kalenik (Каленик)
 Katunets (Катунец)
 Kirchevo (Кирчево)
 Lesidren (Лесидрен)
 Mikre (Микре)
 Orlyane (Орляне)
 Slavshtitsa (Славщица)
 Sopot (Сопот)
 Ugarchin (Угърчин)

Demography 
The following table shows the change of the population during the last four decades.

Religion 
According to the latest Bulgarian census of 2011, the religious composition, among those who answered the optional question on religious identification, was the following:

See also
Provinces of Bulgaria
Municipalities of Bulgaria
List of cities and towns in Bulgaria

References

Municipalities in Lovech Province